Kylie Christmas is the thirteenth studio album, and first Christmas album, by Australian singer Kylie Minogue. It was released on 13 November 2015 by Parlophone. Following the release of her twelfth studio album, Kiss Me Once, Minogue announced her departure with Parlophone, and her management deal with American label, Roc Nation. Minogue signed an exclusive one-album deal with Parlophone to release Kylie Christmas, with distribution through Warner Music Group worldwide and Warner Bros. Records in the United States. A Christmas music album consisting of thirteen songs and three bonus tracks, Kylie Christmas contains both cover versions and original songs.

Three singles were released from Kylie Christmas. "Only You" was released as the lead single on 9 November 2015, a duet with British actor and singer, James Corden. "100 Degrees", a duet with Minogue's sister Dannii was promoted on 24 November and a remix of "Every Day's Like Christmas" was released on 2 December 2015. Minogue performed a one-off concert show held at entertainment venue Royal Albert Hall, London, on 11 December to mark the release of the album. Upon its release, Kylie Christmas received generally mixed reviews from music critics. Many complimented the album's production and the original material while some others criticised Minogue's lack of innovation and delivery, alongside the duets.

On 25 November 2016, Kylie Christmas was reissued as an expanded version subtitled the Snow Queen Edition. It includes six new songs, including a collaboration with British singer-songwriter Mika. The reissue was supported by two more performances at the Royal Albert Hall venue in London.

Background and development
Kylie Christmas is Minogue's first Christmas studio album and her thirteenth overall studio album. Minogue previously released the Christmas track "Santa Baby", which appeared on her 2000 single, "Please Stay"; a recording of "Let It Snow" in 2010; and two Christmas extended plays in 2010, A Kylie Christmas and A Christmas Gift. Speaking with Idolators Mike Wass, Minogue stated "I always thought I would do a Christmas album, it was just a case of when... I mentioned it to a couple of people on my team and they were saying, 'What do you want to do for the rest of the year? What do you want to do next?' I said, 'I'm thinking about a Christmas album, actually.' Some of that stems from last Christmas." Minogue said that she had Christmas in Los Angeles, California in 2014, and her friend suggested recording a Christmas album; "They just assumed I had done one, and when I said I hadn't done an entire album they just started, 'You've got to do it. It would be amazing. We just want to see your little outfits.'" Kylie Christmas was recorded at Angel Recording Studios and Sarm Music Village, and features a mix of both classical Christmas songs and new original material.

Composition
Kylie Christmas is a Christmas music album with elements of EDM, pop, and disco music. Minogue served as the album's executive producer, and enlisted Steve Anderson, Ash Howes, Richard "Biff" Stannard, Charles Pignone, Matt Prime, and Stargate to produce the tracks. This is her second album to be executive producer; she was executive producer alongside Australian recording artist Sia on her 2014 studio album, Kiss Me Once. The standard album consists of ten cover songs and three original tracks; Minogue co-wrote "White December" and "Christmas Isn't Christmas 'Til You Get Here". The third original song, "Every Day's Like Christmas", was written by British alternative rock band Coldplay lead singer Chris Martin (with Stargate) and featured backing vocals that were provided by him. The deluxe edition features three new original tracks: "Oh Santa", "100 Degrees", and "Cried Out Christmas", and were co-written by Minogue. Minogue revealed that she asked friends and colleagues to select their favourite songs from the recording sessions.

Several tracks were recorded with live instrumentation; "Winter Wonderland" and "Let It Snow" were described to have "Vegas-style with horns, strings, and plenty of schmaltz." "Every Day's Like Christmas" was described as a "modern pop ballad", while "White December" and "Christmas Isn't Christmas Until You Get Here" are girl group-inspired songs. "Only You", despite not being a Christmas song, was described as a "sweet" and "tender" ballad, while "It's the Most Wonderful Time of the Year", "Have Yourself a Merry Little Christmas", "Santa Baby", "Let It Snow", "Winter Wonderland" and "Santa Claus Is Coming to Town" (a duet with American recording artist Frank Sinatra) were described as "old school, feel-good festive faves". The tracks "Santa Baby" and "Let It Snow" were originally recorded in 2000 and 2010, respectively; "Let It Snow" was re-recorded for the album, while the 2000 recording of "Santa Baby", although appearing on several various-artists Christmas albums over the years, was never included on any Kylie Minogue album until then.

Release

In October 2015, Minogue announced the release of Kylie Christmas. Kylie Christmas was released on 13 November 2015 as a CD and DVD bundle, while a limited white vinyl edition was released on 27 November. The deluxe album consists of sixteen songs, while the digital download and vinyl editions feature thirteen tracks; the DVD includes six music videos. The deluxe album features a gold ribbon on the cover.

Minogue released the reissue Kylie Christmas: Snow Queen Edition on 25 November 2016 by Parlophone. Released 12 months after the original, the Snow Queen Edition features six newly recorded songs. Minogue announced the release of Kylie Christmas: Snow Queen Edition on 2 November 2016. The album artwork and track list were revealed on the same day. On 4 November 2016, the album was made available for pre-order worldwide via Minogue's official site, offering different options to purchase. It was released worldwide as a CD and digital download on 25 November 2016.

Promotion
Minogue confirmed that she would perform on The X Factor Australia on 24 November in Australia, performing "100 Degrees" alongside Dannii. This was the duo's first televised performance together in twenty-seven years, and their first performance together since their live performance of "Kids" on Minogue's Showgirl: The Homecoming Tour in 2006. On 8 December, Minogue performed "It's the Most Wonderful Time of the Year" on the Royal Variety Performance. Minogue promoted the album with a one-night performance at the Royal Albert Hall on 11 December. Minogue commented on the reveal: "To perform at the Royal Albert Hall will be a dream come true. I can't wait for the 11th December to share a night of joy and celebration with everyone." The show was sold out after its announcement  On 13 December, Minogue performed "I'm Gonna Be Warm This Winter" on the Strictly Come Dancing.

To promote Kylie Christmas: Snow Queen Edition, Minogue made television appearances and performances. It was further promoted by two concerts on the Royal Albert Hall in London, as part of her A Kylie Christmas concert series in December 2016.

Minogue's cover of "Everybody's Free (To Feel Good)" by Rozalla was used in a Christmas TV advertisement for British pharmacy chain Boots. To promote the album in Europe, Minogue performed "Night Fever" on French programme Quotidien. On 6 December, Minogue performed "At Christmas", "Can't Get You Out of My Head" and "Wonderful Christmastime" with Mika on Stasera Casa Mika. The album was also supported by two performances on 9 and 10 December 2016, at the Royal Albert Hall in London, as part of her A Kylie Christmas concert series. On 10 December, was aired a performance of "At Christmas" on The Jonathan Ross Show and on 11 December, "Everybody's Free (To Feel Good)" on The X Factor UK final. On 16 December, Minogue performed "Night Fever" on Danse avec les stars.

"At Christmas" was released as the lead single for the album. It was announced on 4 November 2016, when the album was made available for pre-order via Minogue's official site. The single premiered on 22 November on The Chris Evans Breakfast Show on BBC Radio 2. "Wonderful Christmastime" with Mika was released as the second single off the album. It impacted Italian radio stations on 9 December 2016.

Critical reception

Kylie Christmas received mixed reviews from music critics. At Metacritic, which assigns a normalised rating out of 100 to reviews from mainstream critics, the album received an average score of 55, which indicates "mixed or average reviews", based on 7 reviews. Tim Sendra from AllMusic awarded the album three stars out of five, and stated "She and her team do it right, providing a varied and diverse selection of tracks and moods," and highlighted "Christmas Wrapping", "I'm Gonna Be Warm This Christmas", and "White December" as the album's best tracks. He concluded "Throughout the album, Kylie sounds very game, merry even, and there's enough holiday spirit on offer to help even the grinchiest customer make it through the season with the bare minimum of humbug." The Herald Sun contributors, Cameron Adams, Mike Cahill, and Cyclone Wehner, awarded the album three-and-a-half stars out of five, commending Anderson's production skills and said "Anderson's lush fingerprints were all over her Abbey Road orchestral hits album a few years back and he was clearly the man for this Christmas album." Sal Cinquemani from Slant Magazine reviewed the leaked material, and awarded it three stars out of five. Cinquemani commended the original material, highlighting "Every Day's Like Christmas" as the best track, and praised the album's mixture of Christmas music with disco and electronic dance music. However, he criticized Minogue's "lack of magic", and concluded "that's not to say an album of disco or EDM-infused holiday songs wouldn't have been predictable in its own way, but for a once fearlessly progressive pop star, the otherwise lovingly executed and heartwarming Kylie Christmas feels like a bit of a missed opportunity to innovate a well-worn genre."

However, Andy Gill from The Independent awarded the album two stars. He criticised Minogue's lack of creative delivery, by stating "But they're let down by the lack of character in Kylie's delivery, most notably on 'Santa Claus Is Coming to Town', a posthumous duet with Frank Sinatra, where his easy, relaxed manner is in sharp contrast to her discomfort." He commended the musical diversity of the tracks, highlighting "Let It Snow", "Winter Wonderland", and "Every Day's Like Christmas", and highlighted "White December", "Cried Out Christmas", and "Christmas Wrapping" as the best tracks. Lauren Murphy from The Irish Times argued the relevance of the album, by stating "We've heard it all before, so do we really need another pop star doing another bog-standard Christmas album with a sprinkling of festive cheese? To be fair, Kylie Minogue is better placed than most to do such an album, given her longevity in the business." Murphy concluded "'2,000 Miles' is one of the few saving graces on yet another inessential album that will have no bearing on your enjoyment of the festive season whatsoever." Several publications mentioned the album on their anticipated releases of 2015, including Unrealitytv.co.uk.

In 2022 Billboard listed Kylie Christmas as the 7th Best Christmas Albums of the 21st Century.

Commercial performance
In Australia, midweek expectations had the album inside the top ten. It later debuted at number 7, becoming Minogue's fifteenth top 10 album.

In the United Kingdom, the midweek chart placed Kylie Christmas at number six, which would have made it her eleventh studio album to chart inside the top ten. However, on the week end of 19 November 2015, Kylie Christmas debuted at twelve on the UK Albums Chart. This became Minogue's first album to miss the top ten since her 1991 studio album, Let's Get to It, which reached fifteen.

It was later certified Gold by the British Phonographic Industry, meaning it has outsold her previous studio album, Kiss Me Once.

Track listing

Notes
  signifies a vocal producer

Charts

Weekly charts

Year-end charts

Snow Queen Edition

Certifications

Release history

References

External links
 

2015 Christmas albums
Christmas albums by Australian artists
Pop Christmas albums
Kylie Minogue albums
Parlophone albums
Warner Records albums
Albums produced by Richard Stannard (songwriter)
Albums produced by Ash Howes
Albums produced by Stargate